The North American Rotorwerks Pitbull II is an American autogyro, designed and produced by North American Rotorwerks of Tukwila, Washington. When it was available the aircraft was supplied as a kit for amateur construction, but by 2013 production had been suspended.

Design and development
The Pitbull II is a two-seat development of the North American Rotorwerks Pitbull Ultralight. It was designed to comply with the US Experimental - Amateur-built rules. It features a single main rotor, a two-seats in side-by-side configuration open cockpit with a windshield, conventional landing gear and a four-cylinder, air and liquid-cooled, four-stroke, dual-ignition  Rotax 912S engine in tractor configuration. The  Subaru EA-81 and Subaru EA-82 auto-conversion powerplants are optional.

The aircraft's rotor has a  diameter and the cockpit has a  width. The tailplane is strut-braced and an electric pre-rotator is standard. Construction time from the factory assembly kit is estimated at 100 hours.

The aircraft is intended to resemble the autogyros of the 1930s and as such it uses a radial engine-style round cowling, rounded rudder, barrel-shaped fuselage and other antique styling details.

Specifications (Pitbull II)

References

External links

2000s United States sport aircraft
Homebuilt aircraft
Single-engined tractor autogyros